Count August Zamoyski (28 June 1893 – 19 May 1970) was a Polish sculptor, member of groups Bunt and Formiści.

Zamoyski was an author of stone compositions in simplified and geometrised form. His first works were 
influenced by French cubism and Italian futurism. In 1920s he developed his own, monumental style in which he referred to Classicism. In his last period, Zamoyski was an author of expressive religious works.

Selected works
 Ich dwoje (c. 1917)
 Leopold Zborowski portrait (1924)
 Akt (1928)
 Głowa Wierki (1928)
 Frédéric Chopin monument, Rio de Janeiro, Brazil (1944)
 Assis Chateaubriand monument, São Paulo, Brazil (c. 1950)

References
 
 

1893 births
1970 deaths
Counts of Poland
Polish sculptors
Polish male sculptors
August
20th-century sculptors